Nicolas Taylor (born September 2, 1998) is a professional soccer player who plays as a winger for Cambodian Premier League club Preah Khan Reach Svay Rieng and the Cambodia national team. Born in the United States, he earned his first senior international cap for Cambodia in September 2022.

Early years 
Growing up in Coppell, Texas, Taylor played soccer for Coppell High School where he won the Texas UIL 6A State Championship in 2016 and was named to the 2016–17 NSCAA Winter-Spring High School Boys All-American Team. He was a two-time Gatorade State Player of the Year nominee, finishing as runner-up in 2016. Taylor also played club soccer for Dallas Texans, helping the team become U.S. Youth Soccer National bronze medalist in 2013. With Dallas Texans, Taylor also won two State Cups and two Classic League Division I titles.

College career 
Taylor played five seasons of college soccer between 2017 and 2021 while majoring in marketing. Although he received numerous Division 2 and Division 3 offers, Taylor's only D1 offer was from Conference USA team New Mexico Lobos, coached by Paul Souders. Souders had heard of Taylor as early as middle school because their mothers worked together at the school Taylor was at and later also attended his alma mater, Coppell High School. Despite inviting Taylor to a New Mexico talent ID camp and eventually getting him to verbally commit to New Mexico, Souders left the program to become an assistant to Scott Calabrese at UCF Knights the day before signing day but made a phone call to Taylor, convincing him to remain committed. Taylor ultimately played two seasons at New Mexico, making 29 appearances, scoring six goals and five assists. He earned 2018 All-Conference USA Second Team honors.

When the Lobos program was shut down following the 2018 season, Taylor initially reached out to Souders but UCF already had depth at the winger position. Instead he joined SMU Mustangs of the American Athletic Conference. As a junior, he played 20 games in the 2019 season, registering three assists including one in a 3–3 tie with UCF during the regular season. SMU also beat UCF 1–0 in the 2019 American Athletic Conference Men's Soccer Tournament final. With the 2020 season delayed until Spring 2021 due to the COVID-19 pandemic, Taylor started all 11 matches during the shortened season, scoring two goals including one against UCF.

Having been granted an additional year of eligibility due to the shortened nature of the pandemic season, Taylor entered the NCAA transfer portal. Souders spotted his name on the transfer portal and convinced head coach Calabrese to offer Taylor a spot on the team that night having been impressed during frequent meetings between SMU and UCF. In his fifth year, Taylor started all 16 of UCF's games, scoring three goals and nine assists.

Club career

Orlando City B 
On January 11, 2022, Taylor was selected in the third round (74th overall) of the 2022 MLS SuperDraft by Orlando City. Having spent time with the club in preseason camp, he signed a professional contract with the team's reserve affiliate, Orlando City B, in MLS Next Pro ahead of 2022 season. He made his professional debut on March 26 in the season opener.

Preah Khan Reach Svay Rieng
On February 3, 2023, Nick was unveiled as the new player for Preah Khan Reach Svay Rieng of the Cambodian Premier League. He made his debut on February 26, as a 63rd-minute substitute against Nagaworld FC in the CNCC League Cup and scored six minutes later. PKR Svay Rieng won 5–0.

International career 
Born in the United States, Taylor's mother is Cambodian making him eligible to represent Cambodia internationally. In May 2022, it was reported Cambodian coaches were considering selecting Taylor for the upcoming 2023 AFC Asian Cup qualification third round matches in June but this ultimately did not happen. However, in September 2022, Taylor was first named to a preliminary list of 40 players for an upcoming international friendly against Bangladesh before being named to the final 24-player squad two weeks later. 

Taylor made his senior international debut on September 23, 2022, entering as a 60th-minute substitute in a 1–0 loss to Bangladesh. In December 2022, he was named to the squad to compete at the 2022 AFF Championship. On December 29, 2022, Taylor scored his first international goal, a penalty in a 5–1 victory over Brunei in the group stage of that competition.

Career statistics

College

Club

International 

:Cambodia score listed first, score column indicates score after each Taylor goal

Honors 
SMU Mustangs
American Athletic Conference Tournament: 2019

References

External links 
 Nick Taylor at University of Central Florida
 Nick Taylor at Orlando City SC
 

1998 births
Living people
People from Coppell, Texas
Soccer players from Texas
Sportspeople from the Dallas–Fort Worth metroplex
Cambodian footballers
Cambodia international footballers
American soccer players
American people of Cambodian descent
Cambodian people of American descent
Association football forwards
New Mexico Lobos men's soccer players
SMU Mustangs men's soccer players
UCF Knights men's soccer players
Orlando City B players
Orlando City SC draft picks
MLS Next Pro players